Lena Lotzen (born 11 September 1993) is a former German football forward who last played for 1. FC Köln.

Club career
On 18 April 2016, she extended her contract with FC Bayern Munich until 2018.

International career
With five goals she was the top scorer of the Germany Under-19 national team that won the 2011 U-19 European Championship.  She made her debut for the senior national team on 29 February 2012 against Iceland in the 2012 Algarve Cup.  Her first goal for the senior team was against Iceland on 14 July 2013 in a UEFA Women's Euro 2013 match, where she won the title.

International goals
Scores and results list Germany's goal tally first:

Honors

Club
Bayern München
 Bundesliga: Winner 2014–15, 2015–16
 DFB-Pokal: Winner 2011–12
 Bundesliga Cup: Winner 2011

International
UEFA Women's Championship:  Winner 2013
UEFA Women's Under-19 Championship: Winner 2011
Algarve Cup: Winner 2012

Individual
FIFA U-20 Women's World Cup: Bronze Shoe 2012
Fritz Walter Medal Gold: 2012

References

External links
 Profile  at DFB
 Player German domestic football stats  at DFB

1993 births
Living people
FC Bayern Munich (women) players
SC Freiburg (women) players
German women's footballers
Germany women's international footballers
2015 FIFA Women's World Cup players
Sportspeople from Würzburg
UEFA Women's Championship-winning players
Women's association football forwards
Footballers from Bavaria
Frauen-Bundesliga players